Brooke Tatum Hendrix (born May 6, 1993) is an American soccer player who plays as a defender for Reading in the Women's Super League.

College career
Hendrix played college soccer at Southern Miss from 2011 to 2014.

Club career
In 2016 Hendrix attended trials in the Netherlands with SC Heerenveen and AFC Ajax, but was not contracted by either team. Instead she played in the summer season with Atlanta Silverbacks and ended 2016 in Scotland with Glasgow Rangers. Keen to keep playing when the Scottish season ended, she signed for Swiss club FC Staad in January 2017.

Hendrix represented Fylkir in the 2017 Úrvalsdeild, then joined Brescia ahead of the 2017–18 Serie A season. With the Biancoazzurre she was a runner-up in the league and the cup and played in the UEFA Champions League. She signed for English FA WSL club West Ham in July 2018.

Hendrix was acquired by Racing Louisville in December 2020.

In February 2022 Hendrix signed for reigning A-League Women Champions Melbourne Victory. Hendrix arrival at the Victory signalled a turnaround in their fortunes. She scored on debut in a 1-0 over the Newcastle Jets and dramatically changed a leaky defence. Prior to the Grand Final, Victory lost just two of eight games since her arrival, conceding 0.9 goals per game as opposed to the average of 2.2 goals per game conceded in the six games prior. Victory were crowned Women's A-League Champions on March 27, 2022 after beating Sydney FC in the Grand Final.

On 21 July 2022, Reading announced the signing of Hendrix from Melbourne Victory on a two-year contract.

References

External links
Southern Miss bio
 

1993 births
Living people
People from Coweta County, Georgia
Sportspeople from the Atlanta metropolitan area
Soccer players from Georgia (U.S. state)
American women's soccer players
Women's association football defenders
Southern Miss Golden Eagles women's soccer players
Atlanta Silverbacks Women players
Rangers W.F.C. players
Brooke Hendrix
A.C.F. Brescia Calcio Femminile players
West Ham United F.C. Women players
Washington Spirit players
Melbourne Victory FC (A-League Women) players
Women's Super League players
Serie A (women's football) players
American expatriate women's soccer players
American expatriate sportspeople in Italy
American expatriate sportspeople in Scotland
American expatriate sportspeople in England
American expatriate sportspeople in Iceland
American expatriate sportspeople in Switzerland
Expatriate women's footballers in Italy
Expatriate women's footballers in Scotland
Expatriate women's footballers in England
Expatriate women's footballers in Iceland
Expatriate women's footballers in Switzerland
National Women's Soccer League players
Racing Louisville FC players